Fannie C. Williams (1882-1980) was an American educator.

Early life 
Fannie C. Williams was born in 1882 in Biloxi, Mississippi. In the pursuit to attend college, she moved to New Orleans. In 1904, she graduated from Straight College, a school that later merged with Dillard University. In 1920, she received two degrees from Michigan State College, a Bachelor of Arts and a Bachelor of Pedagogy.

Early Years in Education 
Her first job after college was teaching in Gulfport and Pass Christian, Mississippi from 1904-1908. After this, she moved to Albion, Michigan and taught at Fisk Elementary from 1908-1917.

Later Years in Education 
When she returned to New Orleans in 1921, Williams taught at Valena C. Jones Normal School, a school established to train African-American teachers and then certify them to work in the school system. She would later serve as principal of the school. As principal, she encouraged others to give back to the community by having students go out and help others. One thing she promoted was for students to visit the elderly and give them flowers.  She was instrumental in having a nursery and a kindergarten class established for African Americans in the public school system and established an annual child health day when medical professionals visited schools and performed their service free of charge. Moreover, Williams provide milk and hot lunches for the children to encourage healthy eating habits.

Legacy 
Fannie C. Williams is prominently remembered for her work in education and community development. Within the city of New Orleans, she served as an organizer, charter member, and President for the Board of Management for the African-American branch of the New Orleans YWCA. Started a Health Program which resulted in the creation of Child Health Day on May 1 of each school year. She held a position on many organizations including Board of Directors of the Orleans Neighborhood Center, the Family Service Society, and the Girl Scotts.

In 1977, she was the recipient of awards from the American Teachers Association and the National Teacher's Association. She died in 1980 at the age of 98.

Her influence extended beyond the Orleans Parish School system. She participated in three White House Conferences during the administrations of U. S. Presidents Herbert Hoover, Franklin Roosevelt, and Harry Truman. Williams served as president of the National Association of Teachers in Colored Schools and on the board of directors of Dillard University and Flint-Goodridge Hospital. In addition, Williams was a member of advisory for the Department of Public Welfare.

Because of her contributions to education, Dillard University opened the Fannie C. Williams Hall in 1946 and 1950, which was named after her to honor the work she did in education and to be a public testimonial of all the work she did. In 1961, Williams received the Distinguished Alumni Award from Dillard University.

References 

1882 births
1980 deaths
People from Biloxi, Mississippi
Michigan State University alumni
African-American educators
Straight University alumni
People from New Orleans
Educators from Louisiana
American women educators
20th-century African-American people
20th-century African-American women